Brush Creek is a stream in Cole and Miller counties of the U.S. state of Missouri. It is a tributary of South Moreau Creek.

Brush Creek was so named due to the abundance of woody brush along its course.

See also
List of rivers of Missouri

References

Rivers of Cole County, Missouri
Rivers of Miller County, Missouri
Rivers of Missouri